Mirror Ball – Live & More is a double live album by English rock band Def Leppard released on 7 June 2011. The first full-length live album released by the band, it contains live recordings, three new studio tracks and a DVD containing both concert and backstage footage.

Background
The album was announced on 22 February 2011, but almost a month earlier, on 26 January 2011, Phil Collen said in an interview with WNCX that the band had already written and started recording the new songs, and said the album was planned to be released in May 2011. Release dates and the album's artwork were announced on 13 April 2011, with the album to be released on 3 June 2011 in Austria, Germany, and Switzerland, 6 June for the rest of Europe, and 7 June for North America. The album is being sold exclusively thru Wal-Mart and Sam's Club in the US

The album includes three new studio songs along with the live recordings, taken during 2008 and 2009. The new tracks include the singles "Undefeated", composed by Joe Elliott, who described it as "a big, epic, rock anthem...kind of 'We Will Rock You' with guitars," as well as "It's All About Believin'," by Phil Collen and "Kings of the World," by Rick Savage and described by Elliott as having "a very Queen-type vocal thing," The complete track listing was announced on 7 April 2011. "Undefeated" charted at number 26 on the Billboard Heritage Rock charts.

During its first week on sale, the album sold approximately 20,000 copies in the United States, charting at number sixteen on the Billboard 200.

Allmusic gave Mirror Ball – Live & More a rating of three and a half out of five stars, noting the change in Joe Elliott's voice, "from a metallic screech into a coarse croon," and saying that the album was "far better than most fans will expect it to be."

Track listing

Disc one

Disc two

DVD
Behind the scenes on the Sparkle Lounge Tour 2008–2009, including live performances of
"Rock! Rock! (Till You Drop)"
"Armageddon It"
"Pour Some Sugar on Me"
"Hysteria"

Music videos
"Nine Lives"
"C'mon C'mon"

Charts

Certifications

References

2011 live albums
2011 video albums
Live video albums
Def Leppard live albums
Def Leppard video albums
Frontiers Records live albums
Frontiers Records video albums
Mailboat Records live albums
Mailboat Records video albums